Sudbourne Park Pit is a  geological Site of Special Scientific Interest between Orford and Chillesford in Suffolk. It is a Geological Conservation Review site, and it is in the Suffolk Coast and Heaths Area of Outstanding Natural Beauty.

This is described by Natural England as an important site for the study of the fauna of the Coralline Crag Formation, dating to the early Pliocene, around five million years ago. The fossils are plentiful and diverse, especially bivalves and molluscs.

There is access from a footpath between Chillesford and Orford.

References

Sites of Special Scientific Interest in Suffolk
Geological Conservation Review sites